Västernorrland County held a county council election on 14 September 2014 on the same day as the general and municipal elections.

Results
The number of seats remained at 77 with the Social Democrats winning the most at 38, an increase of six from in 2010. The party received just below 48% of the overall vote of 158,428.

Municipalities

References

Elections in Västernorrland County
Västernorrland